Qeshlaq-e Sarabad (also Romanized as Qeshlāq-e Sarābād) is a village in Anbaran Rural District, Anbaran District, Namin County, Ardabil Province, Iran. At the 2006 census, its population was 77, in 16 families.

References 

Towns and villages in Namin County